Scott Anderson (born January 30, 1974), nicknamed "Slicko", is a runner who specialized in middle-distance and long-distance disciplines in competitive track and field. Although Anderson never competed in the Olympics, at one point he was one of the brightest track prospects in the United States. He finished  in eighth place out of nine competitors in the first heat of the preliminary round for the 1500-meter race at the 1996 US Olympic Trials.

Running career

Collegiate
A four-time All-American with Princeton University's track team, Anderson is one of the few known athletes to have run the mile race in under 4 minutes as a non-professional Ivy League athlete. He ran his fastest college-competition mile for Princeton in a time of 3:59.80 (min:sec) on July 14, 1998.

Post-collegiate
On January 9, 1999, Anderson ran the indoor mile at the 1999 New Balance Games at New York. On December 31, 1999, he ran the Millennium Mile road race in a course-record time of 3:51. He ran his fastest track mile on August 8, 2000 at a time of 3:59.76. On January 20, 2001, Anderson helped push current American Record holder in the mile, Alan Webb, to the first ever North American High School sub-4 minute indoor mile, while wearing a Letsrun.com  singlet.

References

1974 births
Living people
American male middle-distance runners
American male long-distance runners
Princeton Tigers men's track and field athletes